Green River Municipal Airport  is a public airport five miles southwest of Green River, in Emery County, Utah. It is owned by the Green River City Corp. The FAA's National Plan of Integrated Airport Systems for 2009–2013 called it a general aviation airport.

Facilities and aircraft 
Its one runway, 13/31, is 5,600 by 75 feet (1,707 x 23 m) asphalt. In 2007 the airport had 3,260 aircraft operations: 83% general aviation and 17% air taxi.

References

External links 
 Aerial image as of 14 July 1997 from USGS The National Map
 

Airports in Utah
Buildings and structures in Emery County, Utah
Transportation in Emery County, Utah